Hellinsia simplicissimus is a moth of the family Pterophoridae that is endemic to the U.S. state of California.

The forewings are pale creamy, shaded lightly with light brownish, more particularly in costal area, the inner margin and second lobe remaining pale. The hindwings are pale smoky white with paler fringes.

References

simplicissimus
Moths described in 1938
Endemic fauna of California
Moths of North America
Fauna without expected TNC conservation status